Omiodes ovenalis is a moth in the family Crambidae. It was described by Charles Swinhoe in 1906. It is found on Borneo and the Andaman Islands.

References

Moths described in 1906
ovenalis